() is a county of far southern Fujian Province, People's Republic of China, located along the Taiwan Strait. The total population was 200,000. Dongshan County has jurisdiction over seven towns, a nationally managed forest and an economic and technological development district. It is an important port for international trade and trade with Taiwan.

History 

On one of the islands, there are several ancient relics, including the 'Mountain of the Nine Immortals', and the Dongshan ancient city, where two famous Ming Dynasty generals, Qi Jiguang and Zheng Chenggong were based.

Tongling Town on Northeastern Dongshan Island has an ancient waterside castle. Tonghshan Castle was built of stone in 1387 by Zhou Dexing of the Ming Dynasty to protect against Japanese pirates. The gate tower still stands intact. Inside, a path is linked by corridors and the exquisite Temple of Guan Yu. The entrance to the temple is flanked by ancient houses, the birthplace of Huang Daozhou, an official of the Ming Dynasty.

In 1950, at the end of the Chinese Civil War, the island was the scene of fighting between the nationalist Kuomintang and  Chinese Communist forces, and again in 1953 during the so-called  Dongshan Island Campaign, an unsuccessful attempt by the nationalists to retake the island.

Economy 
Dongshan County is situated between two economically vibrant cities of Xiamen and Shantou. Both are Special Economic Zones which have spillover economic effects for Dongshan County, such as increased tourism. The total GDP of islands in 2003 was 3.62 billion yuan. The main industries are fishery, fish farming and asparagus farming.

Tourism 

The tourism industry is based on rich ancient history, seaside resorts and breath taking scenery.

Administration 
There are seven towns under the county's administration:

 Xibu, the county seat
 Tongling, former county seat
 Qianlou
 Chencheng
 Kangmei
 Zhangtang
 Xingchen

The county has jurisdiction over a nationally managed forest and an economic and technological development district.

Geography and climate 
Dongshan is located in the southernmost part of the province, with Kaohsiung, Taiwan  to the east and Hong Kong  to the southwest.

The climate of the Dongshan Islands is humid subtropical (Köppen Cfa) and moderated by their coastal location, without frost through the year. In winter, north-east winds, and in summer south-east winds prevail. The annual average rainfall is only , which causes a shortage of fresh water, especially from October to January. Additional water must be acquired from outside for both domestic and industrial use.

Transport 
Dongshan Port is one of the main ports in Fujian, open to foreign vessels since 2003 and very close to Taiwan and Hong Kong. The port has a large body of water, large hinterland, and a deep, sediment-free harbour. The harbour is big enough for twenty-two 10,000 tons berths. Currently, the port has two deep water harbours built to accommodate 3,000 tons berths. These facilities provide Dongshan Port an important commercial link between Xiamen and Shantou.

References

External links 
 Dongshan Island - A Natural Wonderland diedao.com

County-level divisions of Fujian
Island counties of China
Zhangzhou
Populated places in Fujian
Islands of China
Taiwan Strait